In enzymology, a protocatechuate 4,5-dioxygenase is an enzyme that catalyzes the chemical reaction

protocatechuate + O2  4-carboxy-2-hydroxymuconate semialdehyde

Thus, the two substrates of this enzyme are protocatechuate and O2, whereas its product is 4-carboxy-2-hydroxymuconate semialdehyde.

This enzyme belongs to the family of oxidoreductases, specifically those acting on single donors with O2 as oxidant and incorporation of two atoms of oxygen into the substrate (oxygenases). The oxygen incorporated need not be derived from O2.  The systematic name of this enzyme class is protocatechuate:oxygen 4,5-oxidoreductase (decyclizing). Other names in common use include protocatechuate 4,5-oxygenase, protocatechuic 4,5-dioxygenase, and protocatechuic 4,5-oxygenase.  This enzyme participates in benzoate degradation via hydroxylation and 2,4-dichlorobenzoate degradation.  It employs one cofactor, iron.

Structural studies

References

 

EC 1.13.11
Iron enzymes
Enzymes of known structure